Eberhard Gläser is a retired slalom canoeist who competed for East Germany from the late 1950s to the mid-1960s. He won eight medals at the ICF Canoe Slalom World Championships with five golds (Folding K-1: 1961, Folding K-1 team: 1957, 1959, 1961, 1963) and three silvers (Folding K-1: 1959, K-1: 1965, K-1 team: 1965).

References

German male canoeists
Possibly living people
Year of birth missing (living people)
Medalists at the ICF Canoe Slalom World Championships